C/2007 W1 (Boattini) is a long-period comet discovered on 20 November 2007, by Andrea Boattini at the Mt. Lemmon Survey. At the peak the comet had an apparent magnitude around 5.

On 3 April 2008, when C/2007 W1 was 0.66AU from the Earth and 1.7AU from the Sun, the coma (expanding tenuous dust atmosphere) of the comet was estimated to be as large as 10 arcminutes. This made the coma roughly 290,000 km in diameter.

The comet came to perihelion (closest approach to the Sun) on 24 June 2008 at a distance of 0.8497 AU.

The comet has an observation arc of 285 days allowing a good estimate of the orbit. The orbit of a long-period comet is properly obtained when the osculating orbit is computed at an epoch after leaving the planetary region and is calculated with respect to the center of mass of the Solar System.  Using JPL Horizons, the barycentric orbital elements for epoch 2020-Jan-01 generate a semi-major axis of 1,582 AU, an apoapsis distance of 3,163 AU, and a period of approximately 63,000 years.

Before entering the planetary region, C/2007 W1 had a hyperbolic trajectory. The comet was probably in the outer Oort cloud with a loosely bound chaotic orbit that was easily perturbed by passing stars.

References

External links 
 Orbital simulation from JPL (Java) / Horizons Ephemeris
 Look quick to spot a bright comet (Astronomy 20 May 2008)
 Comet Boattini Brightens (Sky and Telescope 16 May 2008)
 Comet Boattini Sails Towards the Sun (Universe Today 12 June 2008)
 C/2007 W1 ( Boattini ) – Seiichi Yoshida @ aerith.net (with pictures taken by different astronomers around the world)
 Reconstructing the Morphology of an Evolving Coronal Mass Ejection (1 June 2008)

20071120
2007W01
20080612
Non-periodic comets